Sellers Mansion was a historic home located in Baltimore, Maryland, United States. It was a large three-story Italianate / Second Empire style brick structure.  It was constructed in 1868 by Edward Davis as the principal residence for Matthew Bacon Sellers, Sr., who was President of the Northern Central Railway.

Sellers Mansion was listed on the National Register of Historic Places in 2001.

Sellers Mansion was demolished on February 24, 2023 after a three-alarm fire.

References

External links
, including photo from 2001, at Maryland Historical Trust
Sellers Mansion on the Baltimore Heritage website
Sellers Mansion - Explore Baltimore Heritage

Harlem Park, Baltimore
Houses on the National Register of Historic Places in Baltimore
Houses in Baltimore
Houses completed in 1868
Italianate architecture in Maryland
Second Empire architecture in Maryland
Baltimore City Landmarks